The order-4 octahedral honeycomb is a regular paracompact honeycomb in hyperbolic 3-space. It is paracompact because it has infinite vertex figures, with all vertices as ideal points at infinity. Given by Schläfli symbol {3,4,4}, it has four ideal octahedra around each edge, and infinite octahedra around each vertex in a square tiling vertex figure.

Symmetry 

A half symmetry construction, [3,4,4,1+], exists as {3,41,1}, with two alternating types (colors) of octahedral cells:  ↔ . 

A second half symmetry is [3,4,1+,4]:  ↔ . 

A higher index sub-symmetry, [3,4,4*], which is index 8, exists with a pyramidal fundamental domain, [((3,∞,3)),((3,∞,3))]:  .

Related polytopes and honeycombs 
The order-4 octahedral honeycomb is a regular hyperbolic honeycomb in 3-space, and is one of eleven regular paracompact honeycombs. 

There are fifteen uniform honeycombs in the [3,4,4] Coxeter group family, including this regular form.

It is a part of a sequence of honeycombs with a square tiling vertex figure:

It a part of a sequence of regular polychora and honeycombs with octahedral cells:

Rectified order-4 octahedral honeycomb 

The rectified order-4 octahedral honeycomb, t1{3,4,4},  has cuboctahedron and square tiling facets, with a square prism vertex figure.

Truncated order-4 octahedral honeycomb 

The truncated order-4 octahedral honeycomb, t0,1{3,4,4},  has truncated octahedron and square tiling facets, with a square pyramid vertex figure.

Bitruncated order-4 octahedral honeycomb 

The bitruncated order-4 octahedral honeycomb is the same as the bitruncated square tiling honeycomb.

Cantellated order-4 octahedral honeycomb 

The cantellated order-4 octahedral honeycomb, t0,2{3,4,4},  has rhombicuboctahedron, cube, and square tiling facets, with a wedge vertex figure.

Cantitruncated order-4 octahedral honeycomb 

The cantitruncated order-4 octahedral honeycomb, t0,1,2{3,4,4},  has truncated cuboctahedron, cube, and truncated square tiling facets, with a mirrored sphenoid vertex figure.

Runcinated order-4 octahedral honeycomb 

The runcinated order-4 octahedral honeycomb is the same as the runcinated square tiling honeycomb.

Runcitruncated order-4 octahedral honeycomb 

The runcitruncated order-4 octahedral honeycomb, t0,1,3{3,4,4},  has truncated octahedron, hexagonal prism, and square tiling facets, with a square pyramid vertex figure.

Runcicantellated order-4 octahedral honeycomb 

The runcicantellated order-4 octahedral honeycomb is the same as the runcitruncated square tiling honeycomb.

Omnitruncated order-4 octahedral honeycomb 

The omnitruncated order-4 octahedral honeycomb is the same as the omnitruncated square tiling honeycomb.

Snub order-4 octahedral honeycomb 

The snub order-4 octahedral honeycomb, s{3,4,4}, has Coxeter diagram . It is a scaliform honeycomb, with square pyramid, square tiling, and icosahedron facets.

See also 
 Convex uniform honeycombs in hyperbolic space
 Regular tessellations of hyperbolic 3-space
 Paracompact uniform honeycombs

References 

Coxeter, Regular Polytopes, 3rd. ed., Dover Publications, 1973. . (Tables I and II: Regular polytopes and honeycombs, pp. 294–296)
 The Beauty of Geometry: Twelve Essays (1999), Dover Publications,  (Chapter 10, Regular Honeycombs in Hyperbolic Space) Table III
 Jeffrey R. Weeks The Shape of Space, 2nd edition  (Chapter 16-17: Geometries on Three-manifolds I,II)
 Norman Johnson Uniform Polytopes, Manuscript
 N.W. Johnson: The Theory of Uniform Polytopes and Honeycombs, Ph.D. Dissertation, University of Toronto, 1966 
 N.W. Johnson: Geometries and Transformations, (2015) Chapter 13: Hyperbolic Coxeter groups
 Norman W. Johnson and Asia Ivic Weiss Quadratic Integers and Coxeter Groups PDF Can. J. Math. Vol. 51 (6), 1999 pp. 1307–1336

Honeycombs (geometry)